Kafr El Sheikh is an Egyptian city and the capital of Kafr El Sheikh Governorate, Egypt, about 134 km north of Cairo, in the Nile Delta of lower Egypt. As of November 2006, the town had a population of around 500,000.

Kafr El Sheikh was earlier known as Duminqun, but was officially named Fuadiyah or Fouadiyah in honour of King Fuad I of Egypt. After the 1952 Revolution and the subsequent abolition of the monarchy, the governorate took the name of its capital city Kafr El Sheikh. This name, adopted in 1955, means "the village of the chief". In 2006 the University of Kafr El Sheikh was established.

Kafr El Sheikh is responsible for more than 40% of the total sea food production in Egypt.

Etymology 
Kafr is an Ancient Egypt]ian name meaning a "small 
countryside", mainly referring to a rural area with vast gardens and agriculture.

In the era of King Fouad of Egypt, king fouad set up his palace as a form of recreation, as it was far from cities. His name was al-found, and it persisted throughout the reign of his son, King Farouk. When the regime was overthrown and the revolution took place. The revolution leadership decided to return kfar sheik's name to the city, to reflect the city's spiritual devotion towards many Sufi figures.

Geography of Kafr El-sheikh

Kafr El Sheikh is located in the southern side of the Kafr El Sheikh Governorate, it is famous for agriculture, especially the production of rice. The city is surrounded to the east by the villages of Qantara and Sawalha which are separated by a small Canal. Kafr Elsheikh has Desouk and Damanhour to its West, Tanta to its South, and the Mediterranean to its North.

KFS Museum

Kafr El-Sheikh Governorate, since the earliest historical times, had a large share of the contribution to the history of Egyptian civilization due to the presence of the city (Bhutto), which is now known as Tell Al-Faraeen, as it was the first capital of the first organized state in Lower Egypt. The museum aims to display the regional history and many artifacts that have been uncovered in Kafr El Sheikh Governorate, The museum includes three halls, which include the archaeological holdings that were found in the Great Bhutto Cemetery and the temple area, in which several important artifacts were uncovered that embody the story of the conflict between Horus and his uncle Six, in addition to other archaeological sites in Kafr El-Sheikh, including a statue of the deity Horus the Falcon is one of the most amazing statues that have been discovered in Egypt so far, and it is considered a unique copy that can only be matched by the one in the Edfu temple. A hall in the museum was also devoted to displaying the holdings that embody the period of the city of Sakha hosting the journey of the Holy Family during its visit to Egypt, in addition to displaying the history of science during different historical eras such as medicine, veterinary and pharmacy, as well as some topics related to the city of Fuwah, which has a rich Islamic heritage, as it includes all the cultural heritage of Kafr Sheikh as the third heritage city after Cairo and Rasheed.

President El-Sisi inaugurated the Kafr El Sheikh Museum in 2020, which contains many historical and Islamic monuments.

Flag

A pharaonic boat with three overlapping loops, surrounded by two spikes. the boat swims in a blue sea with three winding lines to indicate the coastal environment of the conservation; The three water bodies in the governorate are the Mediterranean Sea, the bars lake, and the Nile river. The rings point to the cooperative system, and the Sabeans point to the province's reputation for rice production

National Day
Kafr El-Sheikh governorate celebrates its national day on November 4 every year, which coincides with the anniversary of the Burullus naval battle in which the people of Burullus defeated the English destroyer during the tripartite aggression on Egypt.  On the morning of November 4, 1956, enemy ships appeared in front of the shore of Burullus, and Egyptian torpedo boats were monitoring their movements, so there was no room for hesitation in clashing with these ships during the day.  To the rest of the squadron that emerged from the middle of this curtain to enter a region of hell that comes out from the artillery craters of the enemy fleet, and our boats fired their shells, hitting one of the French battleships and a British destroyer.

The boats returned to revolve around these ships to continue raiding them until their torpedo loads ended, but they were exposed to enemy aircraft raids and the Battle of Burullus ended in a wonderful way of daring and heroism after the Egyptian Navy hit a new example of fighting and engaging torpedo boats during the day and the survival of some of these boats' soldiers was a source of information.  The battle of Burullus ended in minutes after it recorded for Egypt a bright page in the history of jihad and honor.

Education

The Governorate of Kafr el Sheikh is the holder of prestigious schools. It also has a university that has the following faculties:

Faculty of Commerce
Faculty of Engineering
Faculty of Agriculture
veterinary school
Faculty of Arts

History
Kafr El Sheikh was earlier known as Duminqun (Arabic: دُمينقون) and was renamed after Sheikh Talha al-Tilmisani who died here in 1234. In 2006 the University of Kafr El Sheikh was established.

Kafr El Sheikh is responsible for more than 40% of the total sea food production in Egypt.

Population

The population of the city, according to a census from the Central Agency for Public Mobilization and Statistics, is 10 000 000 in the whole governorate and 1 000 000 in KFS city in 2021. Kafr El Sheikh city, is the fourth largest city in the Nile Delta.

Census of Egypt arrived 101,245,621 In November 2020.

districts with estimated population in July 2017 
Al-Burulus 236,095
Al-Ḥamul 290,628
Ar-Riyad 186,960
Biyala 217,398
Disuq 412,682
Fuwah 179,800
Kafr ash-Shaykh 448,532
Metoubes 303,537
Qallīn 266,195
Sidi Salim 439,536

Mosques
Talhah a

al-Tlemceni

Abaza

Al malek

Ibn taimia

al israa

Ebad al rahman

Al falaheen

Al fath (Stadium mosque)

Al khayat

Abo al Azaem

Sidi qutb

Al rahman (Mosque of el 47 square)

Sheikha Zahra Coptan

Churches 
Justice Church of the Blessed Virgin Mary in Sakha.

Evangelical Church.

Church of St. Demiana and forty virgin.

Saint George's Church.

factories

Kafr El Sheikh is the home to various factories, including a rice mill, a poultry forage factory and a sugar beet factory.

Sport 

Kafr El Sheikh owns Kafr El Sheikh SC which competes in the Egyptian second division league

Climate
Kafr el-Sheikh is classified by Köppen-Geiger climate classification system as hot desert (BWh).

Notable people
Hamdeen Sabahi, Egyptian Politician, the leader of the Dignity Party and one of the leaders of the Egyptian opposition before the 2011 Egyptian revolution
Trezeguet, Egyptian footballer
Osama Anwar Okasha, Egyptian screenwriter and journalist
Saad Zaghloul, Egyptian Nationalist and politician

See also

 List of cities and towns in Egypt

References

Governorate capitals in Egypt
Populated places in Kafr El Sheikh Governorate
Cities in Egypt